KSMJ-LP (100.9 FM) is a low-power FM radio station licensed to Edmond, Oklahoma, United States. The station is currently owned by Oklahoma Fellowship Of Catholic Men.

History
The station call sign KSMJ-LP on February 21, 2014.

References

External links
 
 http://www.okcr.org/

SMJ-LP
Radio stations established in 2016
2016 establishments in Oklahoma
SMJ-LP
Edmond, Oklahoma